The 2015 CONCACAF Beach Soccer Championship was a beach soccer tournament which took place in Costa del Sol, El Salvador on 28 March – 4 April 2015. This was the first time the CONCACAF Beach Soccer Championship was held in Central America. All matches were played at Estadio de Fútbol Playa (Costa del Sol) in La Paz Department, with an official capacity of 2,000.

The tournament served as the FIFA Beach Soccer World Cup qualifier for teams from North, Central America and Caribbean which are members of CONCACAF, where the top two teams qualified for the 2015 FIFA Beach Soccer World Cup in Portugal. In the final, Mexico defeated Costa Rica to be crowned champions, and both teams qualified for the 2015 FIFA Beach Soccer World Cup.

Participating teams and draw
The following 16 teams entered the tournament.

North American Zone

Central American Zone

 (hosts)

Caribbean Zone

Note: Guadeloupe is not a FIFA member and thus ineligible to qualify for the FIFA Beach Soccer World Cup.

The draw of the tournament was held on 27 January 2015, 10:00 local time (UTC−6), at San Salvador. The 16 teams were drawn into four groups of four teams, with the following seeding:

Group stage
Each team earns three points for a win in regulation time, two points for a win in extra time, one point for a win in a penalty shoot-out, and no points for a defeat.

All times are local, Central Standard Time (UTC−6).

Group A

Group B

Group C

Group D

Knockout stage

Bracket

Quarter-finals

Fifth place semi-finals

Semi-finals

Seventh place match

Fifth place match

Third place match

Final

Final ranking

Awards

Top goalscorers
15 goals
 Francisco Velásquez

13 goals
 Lesly St. Fleur

11 goals

 Greivin Pacheco Quesada
 Kevon Woodley

9 goals

 José Ruiz
 Miguel González Enríquez
 Ángel Sáenz Gómez
 Rohan Reid

8 goals
 Nicolas Perera

7 goals
 Daemion Benjamin

References

External links
, beachsoccer.com
, CONCACAF.com
, FIFA.com

Qualification CONCACAF
2015
2015 in beach soccer